Three ships of the Royal Navy have borne the name HMS Shrewsbury, after the English town of Shrewsbury:

  was an 80-gun second rate launched in 1695. She was rebuilt in 1713 and broken up in  1749.
  was a 74-gun third rate launched in 1758. She was condemned in 1783 and scuttled that year.
  was a  launched in 1918 and sold in 1927.

There was also , a  launched in 1943. She was loaned to the Royal Norwegian Navy and renamed  in 1944 and was sunk that year by a mine.

Royal Navy ship names